Henri Franconi, full name Jean Gérard Henri Franconi, (4 November 1779 – 22 July 1849) was a French playwright and circus performer of the early 19th century.

A son of  Antonio Franconi, in 1807 he became with his brother Laurent director of the Cirque-Olympique (1807-1837). An actor, a mime, an esquire, nicknamed Minette, he authored pantomimes, dramas and vaudeville.

Works 

1808: Les Quatre fils Aymons, equestrian scenes in 2 parts
1808: Cavalo-Dios, ou le Cheval génie bienfaisant, equestrian scenes, mingled with féeries, in 2 parts, with Cuvelier
1808: Barberousse le Balafré, ou les Valaques,equestrian and chivalrous scenes, in 2 parts, extravaganza, with Jean-Guillaume-Antoine Cuvelier
1808: Fra Diavolo, ou le Frère diable, chef de bandits dans les Alpes, equestrian scenes in 2 parts, with Cuvelier
1808: La Prise de la Corogne, ou les Anglais en Espagne, equestrian scenes
1810: Les chevaux vengés, ou Parodie de la parodie de Fernand Cortez
1810: Gérard de Nevers et la Belle Euriant, chivalrous and equestrians pantomime scens, with Cuvelier
1810: Le Passage du pont de Lodi, memorable action in 1 part
1811: Don Quichotte et Sancho Pança, folie in two tableaux, extravaganza, with Cuvelier
1811: Les Ermites blancs, ou l'Ile de Caprée, tableaux pantomimes in 2 actions
1811: Le Jugement suprême, ou l'Innocence sauvée, tableaux in 3 actions, with Nicolas Brazier and Cuvelier
1812: Frédégonde et Brunehaut
1812: Geneviève ou La confiance trahie, pantomime in 3 acts
1812: La mine Beaujonc ou Le dévouement sublime
1812: La Famille d'Armincourt, ou les Voleurs, tableaux by Boilly set in action, pantomime in 2 acts, with Jean-Baptiste-Louis Camel
1812: Frédégonde et Brunehaut, historical pantomime in 3 acts after the historical novel by Jacques Marie Boutet
1812: Maria ou le Mauvais fils, pantomime in 3 acts
1812: Les Trois aigles ou les Mariages lithuaniens, historical and military pantomime, with Cuvelier
1813: Arsène, ou le Génie maure, pantomime in 3 acts, extravaganza with machines
1813: Guliver ou la Manie des voyages, pantomime folie in 3 acts
1813: La Dame du lac, ou l'Inconnu, pantomime in 3 acts, extravaganza
1814: L'Entrée de Henri IV à Paris, historical tableau, in 2 acts, with Cuvelier
1814: Le Maréchal de Villars, ou la Bataille de Denain, historical and military action
1814: La Mort du capitaine Cook, ou les Insulaires d'O-Why-E, pantomime in 2 acts, extravaganza
1815: Diane et les satyres ! ou Une vengeance de l'Amour, pantomime in 2 acts, with 1 prologue
1815: Orsino, pantomime with dialogue in 3 acts
1815: Robert-le-Diable, ou le Criminel repentant, pantomime in 3 acts, extravaganza
1815: La mine Beaujonc ou le Dévouement sublime, historical fact in 2 acts
1816: Sancho dans l'île de Barataria, pantomime bouffonne in 2 acts, with 1 prologue, with Cuvelier
1817: Caïn, ou le Premier crime, pantomime in 3 acts, after the poem by Gessner
1818: La ferme des carrières, fait historique, pantomime in 2 acts, mingled with dialogue, with Pierre Villiers
1819: Poniatowski, ou le Passage de l'Elster, military drama in 3 acts, with Villiers
1819: Le Soldat laboureur, mimodrame in 1 act
1820: Le Cuirassier, ou la Bravoure récompensée, mimo-drame en 1 act
1820: Fayel et Gabrielle de Vergy, with Pierre Blanchard
1820: L'Hospitalité, ou la Chaumière hongroise, military anecdote in 1 act, extravaganza, with Pierre Carmouche
1821: La Bataille de Bouvines, mimodrame in 3 acts
1821: Le Soldat fermier, ou le Bon seigneur, mimodrama in 1 act, extravaganza, a sequel to Soldat laboureur
1823: Le Pâtre, melodrama in 2 acts
1823: La Lettre anonyme, comedy in 1 act and in prose, with Charles-Maurice Descombes
1824: Le 27 septembre 1824, vaudeville in 1 act and extravaganza, with Amable de Saint-Hilaire
1824: Le Pont de Logrono, ou le Petit tambour, suivi de la Prise du Trocadero, historical and military action in 3 parts, with Cuvelier
1825: Le Chien du régiment, ou l'Exécution militaire, melodrama in 1 act, with Saint-Léon and Adolphe Franconi
1825: L'Incendie de Salins, melodrama in 1 act, extravaganza, with Saint-Léon
1825: Le Vieillard ou La Révélation, melodrama in 2 acts, with Alexandre-Joseph Le Roy de Bacre
1825: Les Recruteurs, ou la Fille du fermier, play in 2 acts, extravaganza, with Carmouche and Henri de Saint-Georges
1830: Youli, ou les Souliotes, melodrama in 2 acts and 5 tableaux, with Théodore Nézel

External links 
 Henri Franconi on data.bnf.fr

19th-century French dramatists and playwrights
French circus performers
Writers from Lyon
1779 births
1849 deaths
Burials at Père Lachaise Cemetery
18th-century circus performers
19th-century circus performers